Logan Hall (born April 22, 2000) is an American football defensive end for the Tampa Bay Buccaneers of the National Football League (NFL). He previously played college football at Houston before being selected by the Buccaneers in the second round of the 2022 NFL Draft.

Early life and high school career
Hall originally grew up in Elgin, Oklahoma before moving to Belton, Texas and transferred to Belton High School for his final two years of high school. He was named first-team All-District as a senior after recording 54 tackles and ten tackles for loss. Hall was rated a three-star recruit and committed to play college football at Houston over offers from Colorado State, Toledo, and Tulsa.

College career
Hall was a member of the Houston Cougars for four seasons. He was a member of the Cougars' defensive line rotation as a freshman and sophomore. Hall became a starter going into his junior season. Hall was named first-team All-American Athletic Conference as a senior after recording 13 tackles for loss and six sacks.

College statistics

Professional career

Hall was drafted by the Tampa Bay Buccaneers in the second round (33rd overall) of the 2022 NFL Draft. In Week 3, against the Green Bay Packers, he recorded his first NFL sack.

References

External links
Tampa Bay Buccaneers
Houston Cougars bio

Living people
2000 births
People from Belton, Texas
Players of American football from Texas
American football defensive tackles
Houston Cougars football players
Tampa Bay Buccaneers players
American football defensive ends